Lampedusa melitensis (common name: Maltese door-snail) is a species of small, very elongate, left-handed air-breathing land snail, a sinistral terrestrial pulmonate gastropod mollusk in the family Clausiliidae, the door snails, all of which have a clausilium.

This species is endemic to Malta and only known from a single locality on the western coastal cliffs.

References

Lampedusa (gastropod)
Endemic fauna of Malta
Molluscs of Europe
Gastropods described in 1892
Taxonomy articles created by Polbot